The 2019 Walsh Cup is an early-season inter-county hurling competition based primarily in the Irish province of Leinster.

Seven counties competed – six from Leinster, Galway from Connacht and none from Ulster. No third-level college teams took part. Four Leinster counties plus Antrim from Ulster played in the second-ranked Kehoe Cup. The two remaining Leinster counties competed in the third-ranked Kehoe Shield.

It took place in December 2018 and January 2019 and was won by Galway.

Competition format

Three teams receive a bye to the semi-finals – Kilkenny, Galway and Wexford. The remaining four teams compete in an initial group stage with each team playing the other teams once. Two points are awarded for a win and one for a draw. The group winners advance to the semi-finals.

Results

Group stage
Games played 9 December 2018 – 6 January 2019.

Semi-finals

Final

References

Walsh Cup
Walsh Cup (hurling)